The Salca (also: Codor) is a left tributary of the river Someș in Romania. It discharges into the Someș in Dej.

References

Rivers of Romania
Rivers of Cluj County